The 1945–46 Allsvenskan was the 12th season of the top division of Swedish handball. 10 teams competed in the league. Redbergslids IK won the league, but the title of Swedish Champions was awarded to the winner of Svenska mästerskapet. IFK Lidingö and IFK Malmö were relegated.

League table

Attendance

References 

Swedish handball competitions